Temnothorax tramieri is a species of ant in the genus Temnothorax, that is native to Morocco.

References

External links

Myrmicinae
Endemic fauna of Morocco
Insects of North Africa
Hymenoptera of Africa
Insects described in 1983
Vulnerable animals
Vulnerable biota of Africa
Taxonomy articles created by Polbot
Taxobox binomials not recognized by IUCN